Robert Lewis was a 28-year-old African American man who was lynched in Port Jervis, New York on June 2, 1892.  His lynching was attended by what the local newspaper reported was a mob of 2,000 people, and may have inspired Stephen Crane's novella The Monster. 

Lewis was accused by the mob of assaulting a white woman, Lena McMahon, in an incident by the Neversink River, after she had possibly been meeting with her estranged suitor, a white man named Peter Foley.

References

1892 murders in the United States
1892 in New York (state)
People from Port Jervis, New York
Lynching deaths in New York (state)
Murdered African-American people
People murdered in New York (state)
Male murder victims
Racially motivated violence against African Americans
June 1892 events